Julines Beckford (c. 1717 - 1764), was the member of the Parliament of Great Britain for Salisbury for the parliament of 1754 to 27 November 1764. He was the brother of William Beckford.

References 

Members of Parliament for Salisbury
British MPs 1754–1761
1710s births
1764 deaths
Year of birth uncertain
British MPs 1747–1754